The New York Avenue Bridge is a bridge carrying U.S. Route 50 and New York Avenue, NE over the Amtrak, CSX and WMATA rails in Washington, D.C.

In November 2009, the District of Columbia Department of Transportation began a two-year $36.5 million project to repair the underside, deck and roadway of the bridge. Funds for the project were provided through the American Recovery and Reinvestment Act of 2009 (ARRA), and the project was the largest ARRA effort in the District of Columbia.

See also 
 
 
 
 New York Avenue Bridge (Anacostia River)

Footnotes

Road bridges in Washington, D.C.
U.S. Route 50
Bridges of the United States Numbered Highway System